The Cloudbaser Trikes Cloudbaser is a flying wing ultralight trike that was designed and produced by Cloudbaser Trikes. The aircraft was supplied as a kit and was also available as plans for amateur construction.

Production has been completed and new aircraft are no longer available.

Design and development
It features a cable-braced hang glider-style high-wing, weight-shift controls, a single-seat, open cockpit, tricycle landing gear and a single engine in pusher configuration.

The aircraft is made from bolted-together aluminum tubing, with its single surface wing covered in Dacron sailcloth. Its  area wing is supported by a single tube-type kingpost and uses an "A" frame control bar. Because of the light weight of the aircraft, standard hang glider wings can be used. The landing gear features a steerable nose wheel.

The Cloudbaser was designed for minimalism and also portability. The use of a single surface wing makes it easier to fold up and transport on a car-top rack. Set up time is reported to be 30 minutes.

A two-seat version was also marketed by the company.

Specifications (single seater)

References

1980s United States ultralight aircraft
Homebuilt aircraft
Single-engined pusher aircraft
Ultralight trikes